Jean Sacha (1912–1988) was a French film editor, screenwriter and director. He worked as a poster artist before moving into the film industry.

Selected filmography
 The Novel of Werther (1938)
 There's No Tomorrow (1939)
 The Man from Niger (1940)
 Men Without Fear (1942)
 Box of Dreams (1945)
 Lessons in Conduct (1946)
 Fantômas (1946)
 This Man Is Dangerous (1953)
 One Bullet Is Enough (1954)
 OSS 117 Is Not Dead (1957)
 The Adventures of Robinson Crusoe (1964, TV series)

References

Bibliography
 Rège, Philippe . Encyclopedia of French Film Directors, Volume 1. Scarecrow Press, 2009.

External links

1912 births
1988 deaths
French screenwriters
French film directors
French film editors
People from Alpes-Maritimes
20th-century French screenwriters